This is a list of Spanish comics (historieta, cómic or tebeo), ordered alphabetically.

13, Rue del Percebe by Francisco Ibáñez
7, Rebolling Street by Francisco Ibáñez
Anacleto, agente secreto by Manuel Vázquez
Angelito by Manuel Vázquez
Ángel Sefija by Mauro Entrialgo
Alfalfo Romeo by Juan Carlos Ramis
Apolino Tarúguez by Carlos Conti
Las aventuras de Cleopatra by Mique Beltrán
Blasa, portera de su casa by José Escobar Saliente
Bogey by Antonio Segura (story) and Leopoldo Sanchez (artist)
El botones Sacarino by Francisco Ibáñez
Burton & Cyb by Antonio Segura (story) and José Ortiz (artist)
El Capitán Trueno by Víctor Mora (author) and Ambrós (artist)
Carpanta by José Escobar Saliente
Los casos de Ana y Cleto aka Tita & Nic by Manuel Vázquez
Chicha, Tato y Clodoveo by Francisco Ibáñez
Cicca Dum-Dum by Carlos Trillo (story) and Jordi Bernet (artist)
Clara de noche by Carlos Trillo & Eduardo Maicas (story) and Jordi Bernet (artist)
El Corsario de Hierro by Victor Mora and Ambrós
Crónicas de Mesene by Roke González an Mateo Guerrero 
Cuttlas by Calpurnio
Curro Córner by Ozelui
 by Víctor Mora (story) and Carlos Giménez (artist)
Deliranta Rococó by Martz Schmidt
El doctor Cataplasma by Martz Schmidt
Doña Tomasa, con fruición, va y alquila su mansión by José Escobar Saliente
Doña Urraca by Jorge, later: Jordi Bernet, Martz Schmidt
Dr. Pacostein by Joaquín Cera
Eva Medusa by Antonio Segura (story) and Ana Miralles (artist)
La familia Cebolleta by Manuel Vázquez
La familia Trapisonda by Francisco Ibáñez
Fanhunter by Cels Piñol
Federik Freak by Rubén Fdez.
Feliciano by Manuel Vázquez
Frank Cappa by Manfred Sommer
Goomer by Ricardo Martinez (story) and Nacho Moreno (artist)
La gorda de las galaxias by Nicolás Martínez Cerezo
Gordito Relleno by José Peñarroya
El Guerrero del Antifaz by Manuel Gago García
Las hermanas Gilda by Manuel Vázquez (creator) and others
Historias de la puta mili by Ivá
Hombre by Antonio Segura (story) and José Ortiz (artist)
Hug, el troglodita by Jorge Gosset Rubio
Iberia Inc. by Rafael Marín and Carlos Pacheco (writers) and Rafa Fronteriz and Jesús Yugo (artists).
El Inspector Dan de la Patrulla Volante by Eugenio Giner
El inspector O'Jal by Manuel Vázquez
El Jabato by Víctor Mora (author) and Francisco Darnís (artist)
Juan el Largo by Antonio Segura (story) and José Ortiz (artist)
Kraken by Antonio Segura (story) and Jordi Bernet (artist)
Leo Verdura by Rafael Ramos
El loco Carioco by Carlos Conti
Makinavaja by Ivá
Mary Noticias by Roy Mark (writer) and Carmen Barbará (artist)
Mirlowe y Violeta by Raf
Morgan by Antonio Segura (story) and José Ortiz (artist)
Mortadelo y Filemón by Francisco Ibáñez 
Orka  by Antonio Segura (story) and Luis Bermejo (artist)
Pafman by Joaquín Cera
 by Carlos Giménez
La Parejita by Manel Fontdevila
Pepe Gotera y Otilio by Francisco Ibáñez
Petra, criada para todo by José Escobar Saliente
El profesor Tragacanto y su clase que es de espanto by Martz Schmidt
Pulgarcito by Jan
Pumby by José Sanchis Grau
El repórter Tribulete by Guillermo Cifré
Rigoberto Picaporte, solterón de mucho porte by Roberto Segura
Roberto Alcázar y Pedrín by Juan Bautista Puerto
Roco Vargas by Daniel Torres
Rompetechos by Francisco Ibáñez
Sarvan by Antonio Segura and Jordi Bernet
Seguridasosiá by Maikel
Sexorama by Manuel Bartual
Sir Tim O'Theo by Raf
Sporty by Juan Carlos Ramis
Superlópez by Jan
Tadeo Jones by Enrique Gato and Jan
Tato by Albert Monteys
Tete Cohete by Francisco Ibáñez
Toby by José Escobar Saliente
Torpedo by Enrique Sánchez Abulí (author) and Jordi Bernet (artist)
¡Universo! by Albert Monteys
El Violeta by Juan Sepúlveda Sanchis (author) and Marina Cochet (artist) 
Los Xunguis by Joaquín Cera and Juan Carlos Ramis
Zipi y Zape by José Escobar Saliente

References

Spain
Spanish comics titles
Comics